Natrup-Hagen is a railway station located in Natrup-Hagen, Germany.

History

The station is located on the Wanne-Eickel–Hamburg railway line. The train services are operated by WestfalenBahn.

Train services
The following services currently call at Natrup-Hagen:

Railway stations in Lower Saxony